The mixed relay competition of the Sochi 2014 Olympics was held at Laura Biathlon & Ski Complex on 19 February 2014.

Results
The race was started at 18:30.

On 27 November 2017, IOC disqualified Olga Vilukhina for doping violations. On 19 May 2022, the IOC reallocated the standings due to the disqualification of the Russian team.

References

Mixed relay
Mixed events at the 2014 Winter Olympics